Olubunmi Ayodeji Adetumbi (born 22 August 1955) is a Nigerian politician and a Senator of the 9th National Assembly where he represents Ekiti North Senatorial District under the flag of The All Progressive Congress.

Political life
Adetunmbi was elected on February 23, 2019, as the Senator representing Ekiti North against the incumbent, Senator Duro Faseyi, with Adetunmbi gaining a total of 60,689 votes and Faseyi's votes numbering 49,209.

He was also a former member of the Senate in the 7th Assembly which spanned 2011–2015 where he won an award of best 7th Senator of the year.

Personal life 
Adetumbi was born on August 22, 1955. He attended the University of Ibadan.
He has a BSc in Agricultural Economics and also an MSc in Agricultural Economics.

Awards and honours 
 Senate Media Corps Awards for Legislative Intellectualism (2014)

References

All Progressives Congress politicians
Members of the Senate (Nigeria)
Living people
1955 births